Grand Isle Seaplane Base  is a private-use seaplane base located three nautical miles (6 km) northeast of the central business district of Grand Isle, in Jefferson Parish, Louisiana, United States. It is owned by the Freeport Sulphur Company.

Although most U.S. airports use the same three-letter location identifier for the FAA and IATA, Grand Isle Seaplane Base is assigned GNI by the FAA but has no designation from the IATA (which assigned GNI to Lyudao Airport in Green Island, Taiwan).

Facilities 
Grand Isle Seaplane Base has one landing area measuring 15,000 x 200 feet (4,572 x 61 m).

References

External links 

Airports in Louisiana
Seaplane bases in the United States
Airports in the New Orleans metropolitan area
Transportation in the New Orleans metropolitan area